Scircleville is an unincorporated community in Johnson Township, Clinton County, Indiana. Scircleville was named in honor of George Scircle.

History
Scircleville was platted in 1873 by George Adam Scircle and became a small local trade center.  Josiah Drake opened its first general store and John Scircle the first drug store.  In the late 19th and early 20th centuries Scircleville was home to a number of lodges and fraternal organizations including the GAR, Odd Fellows, Red Men and Masons.

The Scircleville post office was established in 1875.

Geography

References

External links

Unincorporated communities in Clinton County, Indiana
Unincorporated communities in Indiana
Populated places established in 1873
1873 establishments in Indiana